Gandaraditya (1108 CE – 1138 CE):  Bhoja I was succeeded by Gandaraditya. who claimed to be the undisputed king of Konkan. During the later period of his regime, his son Vijayaditya defeated Jayakesin II of Goa who had ousted the Shilahara ruler of Thane. Gandarditya executed various public works. At Irukudi in Miraj district he built a lake called Gandusamudra on the bank of which he built temples in honour of Buddha, Jina and Sankara.

References
 Bhandarkar R.G. (1957): Early History of Deccan, Sushil Gupta (I) Pvt Ltd, Calcutta.
 Fleet J.F (1896) :The Dynasties of the Kanarese District of The Bombay Presidency, Written for the Bombay Gazetteer .
 Department of Gazetteer, Govt of Maharashtra (2002) : Itihaas : Prachin Kal, Khand -1 (Marathi)
 Department of Gazetteer, Govt of Maharashtra (1960) : Kolhapur District Gazetteer
 Department of Gazetteer, Govt of Maharashtra (1964) : Kolaba District Gazetteer
 Department of Gazetteer, Govt of Maharashtra (1982) : Thane District Gazetteer
 A.S.Altekar (1936) : The Silaharas of Western India

External links
 Silver Coin of Shilaharas of Southern Maharashtra (Coinex 2006 - Souvenir)

Shilahara dynasty